Ivan Yuryevich Tcherezov (born 18 November 1980) is a former Russian biathlete. He announced his retirement from biathlon at the end of the 2015–16 season.

Biathlon results
All results are sourced from the International Biathlon Union.

Olympic Games
2 medals (1 silver, 1 bronze)

World Championships
5 medals (3 gold, 1 silver, 1 bronze)

*During Olympic seasons competitions are only held for those events not included in the Olympic program.

Individual victories
7 victories (3 Sp, 2 Pu, 2 MS)

*Results are from UIPMB and IBU races which include the Biathlon World Cup, Biathlon World Championships and the Winter Olympic Games.

References

External links
 
 
 

1980 births
Living people
Sportspeople from Izhevsk
Russian male biathletes
Biathletes at the 2006 Winter Olympics
Biathletes at the 2010 Winter Olympics
Olympic biathletes of Russia
Medalists at the 2006 Winter Olympics
Medalists at the 2010 Winter Olympics
Olympic medalists in biathlon
Olympic bronze medalists for Russia
Olympic silver medalists for Russia
Biathlon World Championships medalists
Holmenkollen Ski Festival winners
20th-century Russian people
21st-century Russian people